The Integrated Apogee Boost Stage (IABS - alternately, Integrated Apogee Boost Subsystem) was an American rocket stage used for the launch of Defense Satellite Communications System III satellites to geostationary orbit when using a launch vehicle without an upper stage capable of delivering them there directly. Earlier DSCS III satellites had launched on the Titan 34D (using the Transtage or Inertial Upper Stage) and Space Shuttle Atlantis (using the Inertial Upper Stage), which were capable of delivering them directly to geostationary orbit - as such, the satellites were not capable of moving from geostationary transfer orbit to geostationary orbit themselves. Because of this, launch of these satellites on the Atlas II and Delta IV families required an apogee kick stage - the IABS - to be added to the satellite. The IABS was developed by GE Astro Space, who also manufactured the DSCS III satellites it was designed for.

Design 

IABS consisted of a flat, disc-shaped stage powered by two pressure-fed R-4D rocket engines, fed from a ring of spherical composite-overwrapped pressure vessels containing nitrogen tetroxide and monomethylhydrazine propellants. The stage was spin-stabilized, rotating at 20 rpm. An onboard solar array around its ring-shaped exterior, separate from that of its payload satellite, allowed IABS to remain operational for up to 12 days, granting flexibility in mission planning. IABS was originally intended to make two burns while delivering DSCS III satellites - however, fuel feed problems after the first burn of its first mission rendered the second burn impossible, requiring the payload to maneuver to its final orbit on its own using its reaction control system. On later flights, these two burns were combined, avoiding this problem.

Flights

See also 
 Transtage
 Inertial Upper Stage
 Transfer Orbit Stage

References 

Rocket stages